is a Japanese male curler.

At the national level, he is a 2004 Japan men's champion curler.

Teams

References

External links

Living people
1982 births
People from Kitami, Hokkaido
Sportspeople from Hokkaido
Japanese male curlers
Japanese curling champions
20th-century Japanese people
21st-century Japanese people